Palas Barman (1 January 1929 – 10 June 2000), an Indian politician belonging to the Revolutionary Socialist Party. He was elected to the Lok Sabha, lower house of the Parliament of India from Balurghat West Bengal in 1977, 1980, 1984, 1989 and 1991. Barman died on 10 June 2000.

References

External links
Official biographical sketch in Parliament of India website 

1929 births
India MPs 1977–1979
India MPs 1980–1984
India MPs 1984–1989
India MPs 1989–1991
India MPs 1991–1996
Revolutionary Socialist Party (India) politicians
2000 deaths
Lok Sabha members from West Bengal
People from Balurghat